Wierre-Effroy is a commune in the Pas-de-Calais department in the Hauts-de-France region of France.

Geography

Population

Places of interest
 The church of St.Pierre, dating from the twelfth century.
 The church of St.Laurent at the hamlet of Hesdres, dating from the twelfth century.
 A sixteenth-century fortified manorhouse.
 A Battle of Britain pilot was shot down and crashed in a field near to the village. Time Team dug this site in 2000.

See also
Communes of the Pas-de-Calais department

References

Wierreeffroy